This was the first edition of the event.

Sergio Casal and Emilio Sánchez won in the final 7–5, 4–6, 7–5, against Omar Camporese and Paolo Canè.

Seeds

  Sergio Casal /  Emilio Sánchez (champions)
  Andrés Gómez /  Javier Sánchez (quarterfinals)
  Tomás Carbonell /  Karel Nováček (semifinals)
  Paul Haarhuis /  Mark Koevermans (quarterfinals)

Draw

Draw

External links
 Draw

Men's Doubles